Llanhennock is a village and former community, now in the community of Llangybi, in Monmouthshire, south east Wales, United Kingdom. The population taken at the 2011 census was 496.
The village of Tredunnock was within the community. In 2022 the community was abolished and merged with Llangybi.

Location 
Llanhennock is located two miles north east of Caerleon and five miles south west of Usk.

History and amenities 
Llanhennock is situated not far from the River Usk and is also close to Cwmbran .

References

External links
 Genuki info on Llanhennock

Villages in Monmouthshire
Former communities in Monmouthshire